The Minister for Treaty and First Peoples, previously the Minister for Aboriginal Affairs, is the Victorian Government minister with responsibility for the administration and development of health, education, justice, and social services for Indigenous communities. The individual who holds this office achieves the Government's objectives through oversight of the Indigenous branch of the Department of Premier and Cabinet and other government ministries and agencies. The current Minister for Treaty and First Peoples is Gabrielle Williams, a representative of the Labor Party, who has held the position since March 2020 as the Minister for Aboriginal Affairs. The title was renamed in June 2022 to its current name.

List of Ministers for Aboriginal Affairs

List of Ministers for Treaty and First Peoples

References

Aboriginal Affairs
Indigenous affairs ministries